Emburga is a village in Salgale Parish, Jelgava Municipality in the Semigallia region of Latvia. The village is located at Lielupe river approximately 22 km from the city of Jelgava.

References 

Towns and villages in Latvia
Jelgava Municipality
Doblen County
Semigallia